Avonbeg may refer to:

River Avonbeg
Avonbeg, a local estate in Tallaght, Dublin